Marco S. Rodríguez (born July 10, 1953, in Los Angeles, California) is an American actor.

Rodríguez received his Bachelor of Arts degree from the University of Southern California. He was acquainted with Jeff Corey and Jose Quintero. He taught for a short amount of time in the L.A. Unified School District and then began his acting career shortly afterward.

Filmography 

 The Baltimore Bullet (1980) - Tony
 Zoot Suit (1981) - Smiley / Ismael Torres
 Bay City Blues (1983-1984) - Bird (8 episodes)
 Women of San Quentin (1983) - Ray Ortiz
 T.J. Hooker (1984) - Julio Fuente
 Street Hawk (1985) - Pauley
 Lady Blue (1985) - Barranquilla
 Cobra (1986) - Supermarket Killer (as Marco Rodriguez)
 Extreme Prejudice (1987) - Deputy Cortez
 Disorderlies (1987) - Luis Montana
 Star Trek: The Next Generation (1988-1991) Glin Tell / Capt. Paul Rice (2 episodes)
 Another Chance (1989) - Demon
 Tripwire (1989) - El Tigre
 Internal Affairs (1990) - Demetrio
 Maniac Cop 2 (1990) - Convenience Store Robber (uncredited)
 The Rookie (1990) - Loco Martinez
 Street Knight (1993) - Jack Fernandez
 NYPD Blue (1993-2002, various roles in 3 episodes)
 Frasier (1994) - Leo (1 episodes)
 The Crow (1994) - Torres
 ...And the Earth Did Not Swallow Him (1995) - Joaquin
 ER (1995) - Serena, Customs Agent (1 episodes)
 Nash Bridges (1996-2001, 2 episodes) - Ted Madrid / Socrates
 High School High (1996) - Mr. DeMarco
 Black Dawn (1997) - Chapparo
 Seinfeld, "The English Patient" (1997) - Guillermo
 The Base (1999) - Rosato
 My Brother the Pig (1999) - Edwardo
 Dark Nova (1999) - Bishop
 Seven Days (2000) - General Vendiez (1 episode)
 The District (2000) - Pablito Alvarez (1 episode)
 Unspeakable (2002) - Cesar 
 A Man Apart (2003) - Hondo 
 JAG (2003) - Raul Garcia (2 episodes)
 House of Sand and Fog (2003) - Hondo
 Cold Case (2003-2006) - Manny Fernandez (2 episodes)
 Toolbox Murders (2004) - Luis Saucedo
 Million Dollar Baby (2004) - Second at Vegas Fight
 CSI: Crime Scene Investigation (2005, 1 episodes) - Carlos' Lawyer
 Area 51 (2005) - Ramirez (voice)
 Predator: Concrete Jungle (2005) - Additional Voices
 General Hospital (2006, 2 episodes) - Miguel Escobar
 Bully (2006) - Mr. Castillo (voice)
 Grand Theft Auto: Vice City Stories (2006) - People of Vice City, Commercial
 Hamlet 2 (2008) - Mr. Marquez
 Ready or Not (2009) - Pedro
 Fast & Furious (2009) - Mexican Priest
 Red Dead Redemption (2010) - The Local Population
 Eastbound & Down (2010) - Roger Hernandez (6 episodes)
 Due Date (2010) - Federali Agent
 Final Sale (2011) - Diego
 Desperate Housewives (2011) - Principal Gomez (1 episode)
 Awake (2012) - Marco (1 episode)
 Chuck (2012) - Rocky Falcone (1 episodes)
 NCIS: Los Angeles (2013) - Professor Rodrigo Tamariz (1 episodes)
 Nightcrawler (2014) - Scrapyard Owner
 "Miller Lite (commercial) Cashier" (2015)
 La Migra (2015) - Uncle Manny Chavez
 Castle (2016) - Jorge 'El Oso' Zamacona (1 episodes)
 Inhumans (2017) - Kitang (3 episodes)
 El Chicano (2018) - Jesus
 Velvet Buzzsaw (2019) - Ray Ruskinspear
 Once Upon a Time in Hollywood (2019) - Bartender
 The Pizza Tip (2021) - Coffee Shop Manager
 The Terminal List (2022) - Marco Del Toro

References

External links 
 
 

1953 births
American male film actors
American male television actors
Hispanic and Latino American male actors
Male actors from Los Angeles
American male video game actors
Living people
University of Southern California alumni